Bostrichini is a tribe of horned powder-post beetles in the family Bostrichidae. There are about 16 genera and at least 150 described species in Bostrichini.

Genera
These 16 genera belong to the tribe Bostrichini:

 Amphicerus LeConte, 1861 i c g b
 Apatides Casey, 1898 i c g b
 Bostrichus Geoffroy, 1762 i g
 Bostrycharis Lesne, 1925 i c g
 Bostrychoplites Lesne, 1899 i c g
 Bostrychopsis Lesne, 1899 i g
 Calophorus Lesne, 1906 i c g
 Dexicrates Lesne, 1899 i c g
 Dolichobostrychus Lesne, 1899 i c g
 Heterobostrychus Lesne, 1899 i c g b
 Lichenophanes Lesne, 1899 i c g b
 Megabostrichus Chûjô, 1964 i c g
 Micrapate Casey, 1898 i c g b
 Neoterius Lesne, 1899 i c g
 Parabostrychus Lesne, 1899 i c g
 Sinoxylodes Lesne, 1899 i c g

Data sources: i = ITIS, c = Catalogue of Life, g = GBIF, b = Bugguide.net

References

Further reading

External links

 

Bostrichidae